Gingee is a 2022 Indian Tamil-language drama film directed and produced by Ganesh Chandrasekhar. He stars in the lead role alongside Ksenya Panferova, Yogiram and Sree Ramya. It was released on 18 November 2022.

Cast
Ganesh Chandrasekhar as Jack
Ksenya Panferova as Sofia
Yogiram
Sree Ramya as Aishwarya
Shyju Kallara
Sujatha Doraimanickam
Dheekshanya
Sai Srinivasan
Vidhesh Anand
Sanjay
Darshan Kumar

Production
The film's team held a music launch event in July 2022.

Reception
The film was released on 18 November 2022 across Tamil Nadu. A critic from Maalai Malar criticised the film's staging. A reviewer from Dina Thanthi suggested that the film looked "amateur", while the critic from Dina Malar also gave the film a negative review.

References

2022 films
2020s Tamil-language films